The State of Things is the debut studio album by English alternative rock band Reverend and The Makers. It reached number 5 in the UK Albums Chart, selling just over 25,000 copies in its first week.

Critical reception
The album received positive reviews, with Uncut saying "the record is a tribute to McClure's charisma and unswerving self-belief". The first single, "Heavyweight Champion of the World", reached the top ten and was played on BBC Radio 1's Live Lounge. Other songs on the album, notably "He Said He Loved Me" and "The Machine" become fan favourites and were played in their concerts, including the band's three night run at Wembley Stadium supporting Oasis.

The album includes seven songs that were previously released as free downloads, in a collection of demos entitled Ten Songs produced by Alan Smyth.

The single "Open Your Window" was featured on the soundtrack to the football video game FIFA 09.

Track listing

Certifications

References

2007 debut albums
Wall of Sound (record label) albums
Reverend and The Makers albums